Scrobipalpa atriplex is a moth in the family Gelechiidae. It was described by August Busck in 1910. It is found in North America, where it has been recorded from California.

The second joint of the labial palpi is light ochreous suffused with somewhat deeper ochreous and sparsely sprinkled with black scales. The black dusting is irregular, densest along the costal edge and on the tip of the wing and forming three or four small blackish dots on the middle of the wing. The hindwings are ochreous white.

The larvae feed on Atriplex canescens.

References

Scrobipalpa
Moths described in 1910